The 1996 UAB Blazers football team represented the University of Alabama at Birmingham (UAB) in the 1996 NCAA Division I-A football season, and was the sixth team fielded by the school. The Blazers' head coach was Watson Brown, who entered his second season as the UAB's head coach. They played their home games at Legion Field in Birmingham, Alabama and competed as a Division I-A Independent. The Blazers would finish their inaugural season at the I-A level with a record of five wins and six losses (5–6).

Schedule

Roster

References

UAB
UAB Blazers football seasons
UAB Blazers football